The U.S. Post Office—Yuma Main, also known as Yuma Main Post Office or Yuma Downtown Postal Annex, is the former main post office serving Yuma, Arizona. The post office was constructed in 1933. The building's design, a work of architect Roy Place, is a blend of the Beaux Arts and Spanish Colonial Revival styles. The design includes a loggia supported by Corinthian columns, wrought iron railings and window bars, a molded belt course between the building's two stories, a projecting bracketed cornice, and a red tile roof. The post office was built toward the end of the Beaux-Arts phase of federal building design, as government architects shifted to a "starved classicism" style in the ensuing years.

The building was added to the National Register of Historic Places on December 3, 1985.

See also 
 National Register of Historic Places listings in Yuma County, Arizona
 List of historic properties in Yuma, Arizona 
 List of United States post offices

References 

Buildings and structures in Yuma, Arizona
Yuma
Government buildings completed in 1933
Yuma
Spanish Colonial Revival architecture in Arizona
National Register of Historic Places in Yuma County, Arizona